The Redfield Light Plant and Fire Station, or Redfield Fire Station, at 614 1st St., E, in Redfield, South Dakota, was built in 1900.  It was listed on the National Register of Historic Places in 1978.

The listing included the one-story brick-faced fire station and a five-story fire drill tower.

References

Fire stations on the National Register of Historic Places in South Dakota
National Register of Historic Places in Spink County, South Dakota
Fire stations completed in 1900
1900 establishments in South Dakota